Eugene Alekseyevich Kosminsky (November 2, 1886 – July 24, 1959) was a Soviet historian and medievalist, Academician of the Academy of Sciences of the Soviet Union (since 1946). He was a professor at the Lomonosov Moscow State University (since 1919), first Head of the Department of History of the Middle Ages at MSU Faculty of History from 1934 to 1949.
Laureate of the 1942 Stalin Prize.

Biography
His father was a teacher. Eugene A. Kosminsky enrolled at the University of Warsaw. Then he studied at the University of Moscow under Professors Matvei Lyubavsky, Dmitry Petrushevsky and Robert Wipper. Kosminsky graduated in 1910.

From 1919 he was a professor at the Moscow State University. From 1934 to 1949, Kosminsky headed the Department of History of the Middle Ages. (During the war, A. I. Neusykhin was in his place.) He was succeeded by Sergei Skazkin.

From 1926 to 1935, he also served as Professor of the Institute of Red Professors. In 1936, he received the title of Doctor Nauk. Correspondent Member of the Academy of Sciences of the Soviet Union since 1939.

Evgeniya Gutnova was his student.

Alexander Kazhdan highly appreciated him.

References

1886 births
1959 deaths
Scientists from Warsaw
Academicians of the RSFSR Academy of Pedagogical Sciences
Full Members of the USSR Academy of Sciences
Moscow State University alumni
University of Warsaw alumni
Stalin Prize winners
Recipients of the Order of Lenin
Recipients of the Order of the Red Banner of Labour
Russian Byzantinists
Russian historians
Russian historiographers
Russian medievalists
Soviet Byzantinists
Soviet historians
Soviet historiographers
Soviet medievalists
Burials at Novodevichy Cemetery
Professors of the Moscow State University
Members of the Polish Academy of Sciences